Benny Alon is an Israeli former footballer, active in the 1970s. The top scorer of the Liga Leumit for 1973–1974, he played 3 seasons in the North American Soccer League.

Alon scored 15 goals for Hapoel Haifa in 1973–1974.  He played the summers of 1975, '76, and '77 for the Chicago Sting of the North American Soccer League.

References

External links
 NASL stats

1950 births
Living people
Israeli footballers
Association football midfielders
Chicago Sting (NASL) players
Expatriate soccer players in the United States
Hapoel Haifa F.C. players
Israeli expatriate footballers
Israeli expatriate sportspeople in the United States
Liga Leumit players
North American Soccer League (1968–1984) players
Footballers from Kiryat Bialik